Gregory Kuisch (born 14 March 2000) is a Dutch footballer who currently plays as a defender for Roeselare, on loan from PSV Eindhoven.

Career statistics

Club

Notes

References

2000 births
Living people
Dutch footballers
Dutch expatriate footballers
Netherlands youth international footballers
Association football defenders
PSV Eindhoven players
K.S.V. Roeselare players
Eerste Divisie players
Dutch expatriate sportspeople in Belgium
Expatriate footballers in Belgium